Dacrydium gibbsiae is a conifer species native to Borneo. It grows on Mount Kinabalu on ultramafic soil, and is notable for being able to tolerate the high levels of toxic metal compounds present in these soils.

References

gibbsiae
Endemic flora of Borneo
Trees of Borneo
Flora of Sabah
Least concern plants
Plants described in 1914
Flora of Mount Kinabalu